Elina Jayewardene (née Bandara Rupasinghe; 15 December 1913 – 17 November 2007) was a Sri Lankan heiress and social worker, who was the wife of the second President of Sri Lanka, J. R. Jayewardene and was the First Lady of Sri Lanka from 1978 to 1988. Elina Jayewardene was known for her social work; she was the founder of the Seva Vanitha Movement.

She was born Elina Bandara Rupasinghe, to Gilbert Leonard Rupasinghe, a Notary Public who was a successful businessman, and his wife Nancy Margaret Suriyabandara. Educated at home, she married J. R. Jayewardene, who was an Advocate, on 28 February 1935. Ravindra "Ravi" Vimal Jayewardene, their only child, was born soon after. Elina and her husband settled at Jayewardene's parents house Vaijantha, and later moved to their own house Braemar in 1938, where they remained the rest of their lives, when not holidaying at Pradeep Jayewardene House in Mirissa.

Elina Jayewardene died on 17 November 2007 at the age of 93.

References

1913 births
2007 deaths
First ladies and gentlemen of Sri Lanka
Elina
Sinhalese women
J. R. Jayewardene